Sled Dogs is a Canadian documentary film, directed by Fern Levitt and released in 2016. The film explores the Iditarod, raising allegations of animal cruelty among breeders, trainers and kennelers of the event's sled dogs. However, at least one dog keeper tried to obtain a legal injunction against the film's premiere at the Whistler Film Festival, alleging that Levitt had inaccurately depicted the actual dog care ethics of sled dog handlers, misrepresenting footage of an unethical commercial pet breeder rather than speaking to or filming companies actually involved in the care or training of sled dogs. A sled dog operator also filed a similar complaint with the Canadian Broadcasting Corporation after the film was broadcast on Documentary Channel in 2017, resulting in a report by CBC ombudsman Esther Enkin.

The film received a Canadian Screen Award nominations at the 6th Canadian Screen Awards, for Best Editing in a Documentary (Frank Cassano).

References

External links
 

2016 films
2016 documentary films
Canadian documentary films
Documentary films about animal rights
2010s English-language films
2010s Canadian films